The Second Federal Electoral District of Baja California (II Distrito Electoral Federal de Baja California) is one of the 300 Electoral Districts into which Mexico is divided for the purpose of elections to the federal Chamber of Deputies and one of eight such districts in the state of Baja California.

It elects one deputy to the lower house of Congress for each three-year legislative period, by means of the first past the post system.

District territory
Under the 2005 redistricting process, Baja California's Second District is made of the northeast portion of the municipality of Mexicali, including the eastern section of the homonymous city and other cities in the Mexicali Valley such as Los Algodones.

The district's head town (cabecera distrital), where results from individual polling stations are gathered together and collated,
is the state capital, the city of  Mexicali.

Previous districting schemes

1996–2005 district
Between 1996 and 2005, this district corresponded to the western portion of the city of Mexicali and was, at that time, the smallest of the state's electoral districts in terms of geographical area.

Deputies returned to Congress from this district 

L Legislature
 1976–1979: Alfonso Ballesteros Pelayo (PRI)
LI Legislature
 1979–1982: Juan Villalpando Cuevas (PRI)
LII Legislature
 1982–1985:
LIII Legislature
 1985–1988:
LIV Legislature
 1988–1991: Bernardo Sánchez Ríos (PRI)
LV Legislature
 1991–1994: José González Reyes (PAN)
LVI Legislature
 1994–1997: Francisco Domínguez García (PRI)
LVII Legislature
 1997–2000: José Ricardo Fernández Candia (PAN)
LVIII Legislature
 2000–2003: Alfonso Sánchez Rodríguez (PAN)
LIX Legislature
 2003–2006: Norberto Corella Torres (PAN)
LX Legislature
 2006–2009: Dolores Manuell Gómez Angulo (PAN)

References

Federal electoral districts of Mexico
Baja California